Capetus or Capetus Silvius (said to have reigned 934-921 BC)() was a descendant of Aeneas and one of the legendary Latin kings of Alba Longa. He was the son of Capys, and the father of Tiberinus, after whom the Tiber river was named.

Family tree

Bibliography 

Geoffrey of Monmouth History of the Kings of Britain In parentheses Publications Medieval Latin Series Cambridge, Ontario 1999 page 27.

References

Kings of Alba Longa